San Martino Siccomario is a comune  in the Province of Pavia in the Italian region Lombardy, located about 35 km south of Milan and about 4 km southwest of Pavia. It is now effectively part of Pavia metropolitan area.

San Martino Siccomario borders the following municipalities: Carbonara al Ticino, Cava Manara, Pavia, Travacò Siccomario.

History
According to legend, St. Martin of Tours lived here as a child; in the 9th century a monastery entitled to the saint existed here. Later it was a fief of the Beccaria family (see Montù Beccaria) and other families. In 1743 it was annexed to the Kingdom of Sardinia (Piedmont), remaining the boundary with the Austrian-controlled Lombardy-Venetia until 1859.

On the Gravellone stream, in 1848, king Charles Albert of Sardinia assigned for the first time to his army the Tricolore, which was to become Italy's flag.

References

Cities and towns in Lombardy